Emma Island is an island  long, with bare jagged peaks projecting through an icecap, lying  east of Louise Island and  west of Nansen Island in the southwestern half of the entrance to Wilhelmina Bay, off the west coast of Graham Land. It was discovered by the Belgian Antarctic Expedition, 1897–99, under Lieutenant Adrien de Gerlache, and named after his mother, Emma de Gerlache de Gomery.

See also 
 List of Antarctic and sub-Antarctic islands

References 

Islands of Graham Land
Danco Coast